Anna Wysokińska (born 17 June 1987) is a Polish handball player. She plays for the club Yenimahalle Bld. SK, the Polish national team and represented Poland at the 2013 World Women's Handball Championship in Serbia.

References

External links
Player profile at the Polish Handball Association website 

Polish female handball players
1987 births
Living people
Sportspeople from Wrocław
Polish expatriate sportspeople in Germany
Polish expatriate sportspeople in Turkey
Expatriate handball players in Turkey
Yenimahalle Bld. SK (women's handball) players
21st-century Polish women